Edoardo Molinar (31 August 1907 in Rocca Canavese, Italy – 22 September 1994 in Rocca Canavese, Italy) was an Italian cyclist.

He was a professional cyclist in 1931–1948 (1950), except for Second World War's years.

He was a winner of Puy-de-Dôme (1934) and 13th stage of 1935 Vuelta a España, the 1st edition of this competition. Also he was a King of the Mountains and 4th in General classification of 1935 Vuelta.

Edoardo Molinar took part in Tour de France (1934, 1938) and Giro d'Italia (1936, 1937).

Notes

1907 births
1994 deaths
Italian male cyclists
People from Rocca Canavese
Cyclists from Piedmont
Sportspeople from the Metropolitan City of Turin